Schiedeella is a genus of flowering plants from the orchid family, Orchidaceae. It is native to the Western Hemisphere: Mexico, the West Indies and Central America, with one species (S. arizonica) in the southwestern United States (Arizona, New Mexico and Texas).

Species
Species accepted as of June 2014:

Schiedeella affinis (C.Schweinf.) Salazar
Schiedeella albovaginata (C.Schweinf.) Burns-Bal.
Schiedeella amesiana Garay
Schiedeella arizonica P.M.Br.
Schiedeella crenulata (L.O.Williams) Espejo & López-Ferr.
Schiedeella dendroneura (Sheviak & Bye) Burns-Bal.
Schiedeella dressleri Szlach.
Schiedeella esquintlensis Szlach., Rutk. & Mytnik
Schiedeella faucisanguinea (Dod) Burns-Bal. ex A.E.Serna & López-Ferr. 	
Schiedeella fragrans Szlach.
Schiedeella garayana R.González
Schiedeella jean-mulleri Szlach., Rutk. & Mytnik
Schiedeella nagelii (L.O.Williams) Garay
Schiedeella pandurata (Garay) Espejo & López-Ferr.
Schiedeella romeroana Szlach.
Schiedeella saltensis Schltr.
Schiedeella schlechteriana Szlach. & Sheviak
Schiedeella tamayoana Szlach., Rutk. & Mytnik
Schiedeella trilineata (Lindl.) Burns-Bal.
Schiedeella violacea (A.Rich. & Galeotti) Garay
Schiedeella wercklei (Schltr.) Garay
Schiedeella williamsiana Szlach., Rutk. & Mytnik

See also 
 List of Orchidaceae genera

References 

 Pridgeon, A.M., Cribb, P.J., Chase, M.A. & Rasmussen, F. eds. (1999). Genera Orchidacearum 1. Oxford Univ. Press.
 Pridgeon, A.M., Cribb, P.J., Chase, M.A. & Rasmussen, F. eds. (2001). Genera Orchidacearum 2. Oxford Univ. Press.
 Pridgeon, A.M., Cribb, P.J., Chase, M.A. & Rasmussen, F. eds. (2003). Genera Orchidacearum 3. Oxford Univ. Press
 Berg Pana, H. 2005. Handbuch der Orchideen-Namen. Dictionary of Orchid Names. Dizionario dei nomi delle orchidee. Ulmer, Stuttgart

External links 

Cranichideae genera
Spiranthinae